The 2016 Orlando City B season is the club's inaugural year of existence, and their first season in the Eastern Conference of the United Soccer League, the third tier of the United States Soccer Pyramid.

Roster

Competitions

USL Regular season

Standings

Matches

References

Orlando City B
Orlando City B
Orlando City B seasons